Gillis William Long (May 4, 1923 – January 20, 1985) was an American politician and lawyer who served as a U.S. representative from Louisiana. He was a member of the Long family and was the nephew of former governors Huey Long and Earl Long and the cousin of Senator Russell B. Long.

Early life
Long was born on May 4, 1923, in Winnfield, Louisiana, to Floyd Harrison Long and Birdie Long. His family moved to Pineville when he was a teenager and he attended Bolton High School. When his cousin Earl Long was running for Lieutenant Governor of Louisiana, Gillis gave campaign speeches for him at his school.

In 1939, Long attended Louisiana State University for law, but was interrupted when he enlisted into the army in 1941 as a private. During World War Two he received a bronze star, five campaign stars, and the Purple Heart, and served at the Nuremberg trials before being discharged as a captain in 1947. Later that year he married Catherine Small, and four years later graduated from college with a bachelor and law degree.

Political career
In 1962, he was elected to the House of Representatives from Louisiana's 8th congressional district and was selected to be the assistant Democratic Whip. In 1963, he entered the Democratic primary for the Louisiana gubernatorial race, but came in third place with 15% of the vote. In 1964, he attempted to win reelection, but was defeated by his more openly segregationist cousin Speedy Long. In 1971, he entered the Democratic primary for the gubernatorial race again, but again came in third place, this time with 13% of the vote.

After his cousin Speedy Long retired from office, Gillis Long decided to run for the House seat he had once held. He won and was re-elected six additional times. He rose to the position of Chair of the House Democratic Caucus, which he held from 1981 to 1984. During the 1984 presidential primaries, Long endorsed former vice president Walter Mondale.

On January 20, 1985, Long died from heart failure in Washington, D.C., and a moment of silence was given for him  at Ronald Reagan's second presidential inauguration. His wife Cathy won the special election to succeed him and served one term. In 1994 he was inducted into the Louisiana Political Museum and Hall of Fame.

See also
 List of United States Congress members who died in office (1950–1999)

References

External links

1923 births
1985 deaths
People from Winnfield, Louisiana
Military personnel from Louisiana
Baptists from Louisiana
United States Army officers
United States Army personnel of World War II
Bolton High School (Louisiana) alumni
American investment bankers
Gillis William
Louisiana lawyers
Louisiana State University alumni
Louisiana State University Law Center alumni
Politicians from Alexandria, Louisiana
Democratic Party members of the United States House of Representatives from Louisiana
20th-century American lawyers
20th-century American politicians
Huey Long
Burials in Louisiana
Deaths from congestive heart failure